is the 12th single by Japanese singer/songwriter Chisato Moritaka. The lyrics were written by Moritaka and the music was composed by Hideo Saitō, the single was released alongside "Kono Machi (Home Mix)" by Warner Pioneer on February 10, 1991. The song was used as the opening theme of the 1991 anime TV series Mischievous Twins: The Tales of St. Clare's.

Music video 
The music video features Moritaka as a school teacher in a class of masked children.

Chart performance 
"Benkyō no Uta"/"Kono Machi" peaked at No. 4 on Oricon's singles chart and sold 184,000 copies. It was also certified Gold by the RIAJ in December 1992.

Other versions 
A remix of the song, titled "The Benkyō no Uta", is included in the 1991 remix album The Moritaka.

Moritaka re-recorded the song and uploaded the video on her YouTube channel on December 17, 2012. This version is also included in Moritaka's 2013 self-covers DVD album Love Vol. 3.

The song was remixed by tofubeats in the 2014 collaboration album Chisato Moritaka with tofubeats: Moritaka Tofu.

Track listing 
All lyrics are written by Chisato Moritaka; all music is composed and arranged by Hideo Saitō.

Personnel 
 Chisato Moritaka – vocals
 Hideo Saitō – all instruments, programming
 Yuichi Takahashi – backing vocals
 Seiji Matsuura – backing vocals

Chart positions

Certification

References

External links 
 
 
 

1991 singles
1991 songs
Japanese-language songs
Anime songs
Chisato Moritaka songs
Songs with lyrics by Chisato Moritaka
Songs with music by Hideo Saitō (musician, born 1958)
Warner Music Japan singles